The Extreme Euro Open is an IPSC level 3 shooting competition held annually in June at the Hodonice shooting range near the town Znojmo in the South Moravian Region of the Czech Republic. The match is organized by the company Extreme Gun Group, Ltd. and the Extreme Squad shooting club.

The match is divided into a Pre and Main Match, where the Pre Match is for the Range Officers later working at the Main Match as well as representatives of the match sponsors. The Main Match lasts three days (Thursday, Friday and Saturday), and is divided into morning and afternoon shifts. On Sunday, the best shooters from the Main Match vie for the Shoot-Off, which was changed to the Super Six format in 2015. Then the six best shooters from the Main Match in each division and some categories compete in an elimination round across three stages. The match is finished with an award ceremony.

Lubor Novak from the Czech Republic is the Match Director and founder of the match, and Wieslaw Geno Sioda from Poland is Stats Director.

The match is part of the WORLD EXTREME CUP, IPSC level 3 matches series. The matches took place in the Czech Republic, Russia, Thailand and Poland.

The shooting competition in 2020 was postponed to year 2021. The 12th Extreme Euro Open 2021 took place under strict anti-pandemic measures. Even so, 482 shooters from 32 countries took part in this match.

Winners

The shooting range 
The Hodonice shooting range is situated 12 kilometres southeast of Znojmo city and is owned by the Kub IPSC Znojmo. The range was built in the 1990s from a former gravel pit, and its 28 shooting bays and total length of more than 500 meters makes it one of the largest outdoor shooting ranges in Europe. The range has a parking lot with capacity for 100 cars, an office building, sanitary facilities, space for chronographing and safety areas. The shooting range is used for matches, training, shooting instruction and corporate events. Among big matches held on the range are the Extreme Euro Open, Czech Super League and the IPSC Czech Rifle Championship.

External links 
Official website
Article on Firearmsguide.com
 GUNSMOKE 3. REGIONAL SHOOTING MAGAZINE
  Success of the Grand Power weapons on the III. CZ EEO 2010 
  Fire Wire Magazine
  The live recording Super 6 from 2016 in Česká televize
  Article on CZUB Česká Zbrojovka Uherský Brod
  TV show Extreme Euro Open from 2014 in Česká televize
  Article in magazine strelectvi.cz
 практическая стрельба

IPSC shooting competitions